Anna Blinkova and Raluca Olaru were the defending champions, but chose not to participate this year.

María José Martínez Sánchez and Sara Sorribes Tormo won the title, defeating Georgina García Pérez and Oksana Kalashnikova in the final, 7–5, 6–1.

Seeds

Draw

Draw

References

External links
 Main Draw

Grand Prix SAR La Princesse Lalla Meryem - Doubles
2019 Doubles
2019 in Moroccan tennis